Adermann is a surname. Notable people with the surname include:

 Charles Adermann (1896–1979), Australian politician
 Evan Adermann (1927–2001), Australian politician

See also 
 Aderman

References